469219 Kamoʻoalewa, provisionally designated , is a very small asteroid, fast rotator and near-Earth object of the Apollo group, approximately  in diameter. At present it is a quasi-satellite of Earth, and currently the smallest, closest, and most stable known such quasi-satellite. The asteroid was discovered by Pan-STARRS at Haleakala Observatory on 27 April 2016. It was named , a Hawaiian word that refers to an oscillating celestial object. The Earth-like orbit and lunar-like silicates may be a result of it being lunar ejecta.

Discovery and naming 

Kamoʻoalewa was first spotted on 27 April 2016, by the Pan-STARRS 1 asteroid survey telescope on Haleakalā, Hawaii, that is operated by the University of Hawaii's Institute for Astronomy and funded by NASA's Planetary Defense Coordination Office. The name Kamoʻoalewa is derived from the Hawaiian words ka 'the', moʻo 'fragment', referring to it being a piece broken off a larger object, a 'of', and lewa 'to oscillate', referring to its motion in the sky as viewed from Earth. The official  was published by the Minor Planet Center on 6 April 2019.

Orbit and classification 

Kamoʻoalewa orbits the Sun at a distance of 0.90–1.10 AU. Although the period as of 2022 is about 366 days, its longer-term average period is closer to 365 days since it is a quasi-satellite of Earth and will continue to be so for hundreds of years. Its orbit has an eccentricity of 0.10 and an inclination of 8° with respect to the ecliptic. It has an Earth minimum orbital intersection distance of  that translates into 13 lunar distances.

Quasi-satellite of Earth 

As it orbits the Sun, Kamoʻoalewa appears to circle (highly elliptically) around Earth as well. The object is beyond the Hill sphere of Earth and the Sun exerts a much stronger pull on it than Earth does. Although it is too distant to be considered a true natural satellite of Earth, it is the best and most stable example to date of a near-Earth companion, or quasi-satellite.

Paul Chodas, manager of NASA's Center for Near-Earth Object (NEO) Studies at the Jet Propulsion Laboratory in Pasadena, California, commented on the orbit:

In its yearly trek around the Sun, Kamoʻoalewa spends approximately half of the time closer to the Sun than Earth is (that is, the asteroid is inside the Earth's orbit) and passes ahead of our planet, and approximately half of the time farther away (crosses outside Earth's orbit), causing it to fall behind. Also, its orbit is tilted a little, causing it to bob up and then down once each year through Earth's orbital plane. In effect, this small asteroid is caught in a game of leap frog with Earth that will last for hundreds of years.

Chodas explained how the asteroid's orbit also undergoes a slow, back-and-forth twist over multiple decades: "The asteroid's loops around Earth drift a little ahead or behind from year to year, but when they drift too far forward or backward, Earth's gravity is just strong enough to reverse the drift and hold onto the asteroid so that it never wanders farther away than about 100 times the distance of the moon. The same effect also prevents the asteroid from approaching much closer than about 38 times the distance of the moon. In effect, this small asteroid is caught in a little dance with Earth."

In terms of orbit, it currently is the most stable among the quasi-satellites of Earth that have been discovered and will remain in that orbit for about the next 300 years. By late May 2369 the asteroid will be  from Earth. The Earth-like orbit may be a result of it being lunar ejecta.

Physical characteristics 

Based on an assumed standard albedo for stony S-type asteroids of 0.20, its absolute magnitude of 24.3 corresponds to a  diameter.

Photometric observations in April 2017 revealed that Kamoʻoalewa is a fast rotator.

In 2021, a comprehensive physical characterization of Kamoʻoalewa was conducted using the Large Binocular Telescope and the Lowell Discovery Telescope, which found that the asteroid is composed of lunar-like silicates and may be an impact fragment from the Moon.

Proposed missions 
During the 2017 Astrodynamics Specialist Conference held in Stevenson in the U.S. state of Washington, a team composed of graduate research assistants from the University of Colorado Boulder and the São Paulo State University (UNESP) was awarded for presenting a project denominated "Near-Earth Asteroid Characterization and Observation (NEACO) Mission to Asteroid (469219) ", providing the first baselines for the investigation of this celestial object using a spacecraft. Recently, another version of this work was presented adopting different constraints in the dynamics.

The China National Space Administration (CNSA) is planning a robotic mission that would return samples from Kamoʻoalewa. This mission, Tianwen-2, is planned to launch in 2025.

Gallery

See also 

 Arjuna asteroid
 Natural satellite
 Quasi-satellite
 3753 Cruithne
 6Q0B44E
 
 
 
 
 
 
 
 
 
 , a quasi-satellite of Venus, and the first quasi-satellite discovered around any major planet

Notes

References

External links 
 Asteroid 2016 HO3 - Earth's Constant Companion NASA Jet Propulsion Laboratory, 23 June 2016
 Asteroid Lightcurve Database (LCDB), query form (info )
 
 
 

469219
469219
Named minor planets
469219
469219
20160427